= Social perceptions of epilepsy in Togo =

Epilepsy remains a major public health issue, largely complicated by widespread fear, stigma, and misconceptions that often result in discrimination and human rights violations. Many of the daily challenges faced by people with epilepsy are not caused only by the condition itself, but by negative public beliefs and misunderstanding, which can delay access to treatment and damage social relationship.

In many African settings, traditional beliefs about epilepsy persist despite advances in modern medicine. These cultural misconceptions contribute to strong social stigma, leading to marginalization of people with epilepsy and emotional and social burdens on both patients and their families. The impact is especially severe in low-income countries such as Togo, where stigma is more intense.People living with epilepsy also face physical risks during seizures, including injury or death, which can further restrict their participation in everyday activities out of fear of harm. This exclusion, combined with stigma, often limits social interaction and childhood development. Overall, continued misconceptions in many African societies worsen the management, experience, and outcomes of epilepsy

A large epidemiological study conducted in Togo investigated the use of traditional scarification as a treatment for epilepsy by examining over 36,000 hospital patients, surveying approximately 30,000 community residents, and interviewing 40,000 traditional healers. The findings showed that forehead scarification was a common traditional marker of epilepsy treatment, with more than 80% of people with epilepsy bearing such scars. Patients with infrequent seizures typically had small, concealed scars near the hairline, whereas those with frequent and more visible seizures often had larger, prominent forehead scars. These visible scarifications not only reflected traditional therapeutic practices but also served as a public identifier of epilepsy, contributing to social stigma and discrimination against affected individual. Below are social perceptions encountered by People With Epilepsy(PWE) in togo and some Sub-Saharan African countries.

== Cultural and spiritual beliefs about epilepsy ==
Across sub-Saharan Africa, epilepsy has long been understood through a spiritual and cultural lens rather than a medical one. Many communities attribute the condition to evil spirits, witchcraft, hereditary factors, or even dietary practices such as excessive palm oil consumption. A esearch found that hereditary factors accounted for 40% of attributed causes, food-related beliefs for 20%, and spiritual forces for 16%. A study conducted in Togo and Benin found that over half of respondents in Togo (53.5%) and nearly half in Benin (44.3%) believed epilepsy had supernatural origins. These deeply rooted beliefs vary across ethnic groups and countries, and largely explain why many patients turn to traditional healers rather than seeking conventional medical care.

== Stigma and social rejection ==
Stigma remains one of the most damaging social consequences of epilepsy in sub-saharan Africa region. In a study conducted, 66.35% of participants reported experiencing some form of stigmatization. The most frequently reported form was devaluation, cited by 29.81% of respondents, followed by outright rejection at 19.23%. People living with epilepsy are often marginalized from productive social and economic life, partly out of concern over seizure-related injuries, but more significantly due to the social shame attached to the condition.

== Impact on marriage and family life ==
The stigma surrounding epilepsy extends deeply into family and marital relationships. Some patients have been abandoned by their spouses following seizure episodes, including incidents of nocturnal incontinence during convulsions. Women with epilepsy face particularly harsh social judgement, with community members openly describing them as unsuitable wives on the grounds that they are unable to adequately care for children, cook safely, or perform domestic tasks. As a result, women living with epilepsy frequently face severely limited marriage prospects

== Anxiety and depression ==
A cross-sectional study conducted in Togo and Benin, West Africa, assessed the prevalence of anxiety and depression among 496 adults with epilepsy and an equal number of individuals without epilepsy using Goldberg's Anxiety and Depression Scale. The findings showed that people with epilepsy had significantly higher levels of both anxiety and depression than the control group (p < 0.0001). The prevalence of probable major anxiety and depression was also markedly greater among individuals with epilepsy. Furthermore, higher anxiety and depression scores were associated with more frequent seizures and lack of treatment. Overall, the study confirmed that anxiety and depression are common psychiatric comorbidities among people living with epilepsy in Togo and Benin.
